is a Japanese female mixed martial artist, kickboxer and karateka. She has participated in MMA promotions Smackgirl and Jewels. Her nickname is Shooting Star.

Background
She started judo during childhood, earning third place in an all-high school tournament in China. She graduated from the Hiroshima Prefectural Hiroshima Technical High School.

In 2006, she was introduced to the Karate-do Zendokai association in their Hiroshima branch and, wanting to become a professional martial artist, she moved to Tokyo.

Mixed martial arts career

On , Ishioka participated at Smackgirl 2007: The Dance of the Taisho Romance in the Next Cinderella Tournament 2007 lightweight first round, where she defeated Yoko Oyama by unanimous decision.

Ishioka rebounded back with three consecutive victories. She next defeated Miyuki Ariga, also by unanimous decision, in a match with special rules on  during Kingdom of Grapple Live 2007.

'08.

On , Ishioka made her debut with MMA promotion Jewels at Jewels 1st Ring, where she defeated Mika Nagano by unanimous decision in the main event.

Ishioka then challenged the world's number one ranked female fighter Megumi Fujii. On , Fujii submitted Ishioka by armbar at Jewels 4th Ring.

On  at Jewels 6th Ring, Ishioka defeated Sally Krumdiack with a controversial finish in which Ishioka had Krumdiack in a weak armbar and the referee asked Krumdiack if she was okay. Krumdiack responded that she was, but the referee mistook the answer and incorrectly stopped the fight. Ringside officials recognized the mistake and it was expected that the fight would be ruled a no contest, but the result remained as a victory for Ishioka.

She defeated Oya by submission due to an armbar in the first round.

She was defeated for the second time by unanimous decision.

She was defeated by unanimous decision.

She defeated Sunaba by armbar submission in the second round.

After giving birth, Ishioka was scheduled to return to MMA on February 16, 2014, but her match had to be canceled when her opponent, Mika Nagano, announced her pregnancy.

Shoot boxing career

Other activities
Ishioka won the All-Japan RF Karate Championships -52 kg in 2007 and in 2009.

Ishioka has participated in a few grappling matches. On , Ishioka was defeated by Kyoko Abe with an armbar submission at Gi Grappling 2008 during the first round of the Gi Grappling 2008 Queen Tournament expert -52.0 kg. She was defeated by split decision.

Personal life
On , Ishioka announced that she was expecting a baby and would marry a fellow karateka from Zendokai.

Mixed martial arts record

|-
| Loss
|align=center| 15-12
|Miyuu Yamamoto
|Decision (split)
|Rizin 11
|
|align=center|3
|align=center|5:00
|Saitama, Japan
|
|-
| Loss
|align=center| 15-11
|Kanna Asakura
|Decision (unanimous)
|Deep Jewels 17
|
|align=center|3
|align=center|5:00
|Tokyo, Japan
|
|-
| Won
|align=center| 15-10
|Bestare Kicaj
|Submission (rear naked choke)
|Rizin FF 5: Sakura
|
|align=center|1
|align=center|2:12
|Yokohama, Japan
|
|-
| Loss
| align=center| 14-10
| Mina Kurobe
| Decision (unanimous)
| Deep-Jewels 14
| 
| align=center| 3
| align=center| 5:00
| Tokyo, Japan
| 
|-
| Win
| align=center| 14-9
| Hana Date
| Submission (Armbar)
| Deep-Jewels 12
| 
| align=center| 1
| align=center| 4:39
| Tokyo, Japan
| 
|-
| Loss
| align=center| 13-9
| Emi Tomimatsu
| Submission (rear naked choke)
| Deep-Jewels 11
| 
| align=center| 2
| align=center| 4:49
| Tokyo, Japan
| 
|-
| Loss
| align=center| 13-8
| Seo Hee Ham
| Submission (armbar)
| Deep-Jewels 6
| 
| align=center| 2
| align=center| 2:43
| Tokyo, Japan
|  
|-
| Win
| align=center| 13-7
| Satomi Takano
| Technical Submission (armbar)
| Deep-Jewels 4
| 
| align=center| 1
| align=center| 4:44
| Tokyo, Japan
| 
|-
| Win
| align=center| 12-7
| Tomomi Sunaba
| Submission (armbar)
| Pancrase - Progress Tour 3
| 
| align=center| 2
| align=center| 1:04
| Tokyo, Japan
| 
|-
| Loss
| align=center| 11-7
| Yuka Tsuji
| Decision (unanimous)
| Jewels 15th Ring
| 
| align=center| 2
| align=center| 5:00
| Tokyo, Japan
| 
|-
| Loss
| align=center| 11-6
| Seo Hee Ham
| Decision (unanimous)
| Deep: 52 Impact
| 
| align=center| 2
| align=center| 5:00
| Tokyo, Japan
| 
|-
| Win
| align=center| 11-5
| Yuko Oya
| Submission (armbar)
| Jewels 11th Ring
| 
| align=center| 1
| align=center| 2:14
| Tokyo, Japan
| 
|-
| Win
| align=center| 10-5
| Celine Haga
| Decision (unanimous)
| Jewels 10th Ring
| 
| align=center| 2
| align=center| 5:00
| Tokyo, Japan
| 
|-
| Loss
| align=center| 9-5
| Sakura Nomura
| Decision (unanimous)
| Jewels 9th Ring
| 
| align=center| 2
| align=center| 5:00
| Tokyo, Japan
| 
|-
| Win
| align=center| 9-4
| Mai Ichii
| Submission (armbar)
| Jewels 8th Ring
| 
| align=center| 2
| align=center| 2:41
| Tokyo, Japan
| 
|-
| Win
| align=center| 8-4
| Sally Krumdiack
| Technical submission (armbar)
| Jewels 6th Ring
| 
| align=center| 1
| align=center| 2:45
| Tokyo, Japan
| 
|-
| Loss
| align=center| 7-4
| Megumi Fujii
| Submission (armbar)
| Jewels 4th Ring
| 
| align=center| 2
| align=center| 4:17
| Tokyo, Japan
| 
|-
| Win
| align=center| 7-3
| Hanako Kobayashi
| TKO (punches)
| Jewels 2nd Ring
| 
| align=center| 1
| align=center| 2:20
| Tokyo, Japan
| 
|-
| Win
| align=center| 6-3
| Mika Nagano
| Decision (unanimous)
| Jewels 1st Ring
| 
| align=center| 2
| align=center| 5:00
| Tokyo, Japan
| 
|-
| Win
| align=center| 5-3
| Harumi
| Submission (armbar)
| Kingdom of Grapple mini Live in Summerfest!! '08
| 
| align=center| 1
| align=center| 2:45
| Tokyo, Japan
| 
|-
| Loss
| align=center| 4-3
| Seo Hee Ham
| Decision (unanimous)
| Smackgirl World ReMix Tournament 2008 Opening Round
| 
| align=center| 2
| align=center| 5:00
| Tokyo, Japan
| 
|-
| Win
| align=center| 4-2
| Thricia Poovey
| Submission (armbar)
| Smackgirl 7th Anniversary: Starting Over
| 
| align=center| 1
| align=center| 4:18
| Tokyo, Japan
| 
|-
| Win
| align=center| 3-2
| Miyuki Ariga
| Decision (unanimous)
| Kingdom of Grapple Live 2007
| 
| align=center| 2
| align=center| 5:00
| Tokyo, Japan
| 
|-
| Win
| align=center| 2-2
| Masako Yoshida
| Decision (unanimous)
| Smackgirl 2007: Queens' Hottest Summer
| 
| align=center| 2
| align=center| 5:00
| Tokyo, Japan
| 
|-
| Loss
| align=center| 1-2
| Mei Yamaguchi
| Submission (kneebar)
| Smackgirl - F 2007: The Next Cinderella Tournament 2007 Second Stage
| 
| align=center| 2
| align=center| 1:24
| Tokyo, Japan
| 
|-
| Win
| align=center| 1-1
| Yoko Oyama
| Decision (unanimous)
| Smackgirl 2007: The Dance of the Taisho Romance
| 
| align=center| 2
| align=center| 5:00
| Osaka, Japan
| 
|-
| Loss
| align=center| 0-1
| Kyoko Takabayashi
| Decision (unanimous)
| Smackgirl - F 2007: The Next Cinderella Tournament 2007 First Stage
| 
| align=center| 2
| align=center| 5:00
| Tokyo, Japan
|

Kickboxing record

Legend:

Championships and accomplishments
All-Japan RF Karate Championships -52 kg in 2007
All-Japan RF Karate Championships -52 kg in 2009

See also
List of female mixed martial artists
List of female kickboxers

References

External links
Official blog 
 
 Saori Ishioka Awakening Profile

Profile at Shoot boxing 
 

1987 births
Living people
Japanese female mixed martial artists
Mixed martial artists utilizing karate
Mixed martial artists utilizing judo
Mixed martial artists utilizing shootboxing
Japanese female kickboxers
Japanese female karateka
Sportspeople from Hiroshima Prefecture
Strawweight mixed martial artists